Kamlaksha Rama Naik, better known as K R Naik (Hindi: क़ रा नायक़) is an Indian industrial engineer. He founded D-Link Ltd. (India) in 1993. He has been in the IT Industry for 50 years and has played a key role in creating the IT networking market and the surrounding channel ecosystem in India. He pioneered several new businesses and distribution models as early as 1990, when IT was a nascent industry and the concept of an IT distribution channel was just conceived.
He is widely regarded as The Father of India’s IT Networking Industry as he accredited for giving India its first IT Networking company Smartlink Network Systems Ltd., which has a local manufacturing success story for over three decades. He has been instrumental in introducing global IT brands like CISCO, D-Link, Foundry, Lanner, Mercury Link, Gigabyte in India having manufacturing as well as R&D operation. In 1994 he entered into a joint venture with a multinational - D-Link Corporation under the name “D-Link India” with a manufacturing facility in Goa and corporate office in Mumbai. Further he introduced DIGILINK Brand of passive networking Structured Cabling Systems. Riding on the back of a strong domestic growth curve, in the year 2008 a formal demerger with the JV partner, resulted in Smartlink sharpening its focus further on brand DIGILINK and other businesses. In the year 2009, he introduced the DIGISOL brand. Mr. K. R. Naik is a Mechanical Engineer with P.G in Industrial Engineering and a Diploma in Business Management.  He started his career with IBM, working in various departments, including product design and development.  Mr. Naik is also a former President of MAIT Manufacturers’ Association for Information Technology.

Early life
Naik was born in Karwar, Karnataka on 19 November 1947. He completed his schooling in Karwar and later shifted to Mumbai. Naik is a mechanical engineer with a P.G. Diploma in Industrial Engineering and Licenciate in Plastic Engineering. He earned a Business Management degree from the Jamnalal Bajaj Institute in Mumbai.

Career
His first job at Mumbai was with Bradma, but soon after that he joined IBM India in 1970 starting as a Mainframe Peripheral Assembly Engineer. In 1977 he contributed significantly to the development of an indigenous line printer at the 'Big Blue' center. He worked to develop indigenous computer peripheral parts of plastic and metal until IBM closed its Indian operation in 1978. After IBM closed down, he joined ORG System Ltd. wherein he was one of the 6 team members who developed the first indigenous line printers with a speed of 1000+ line per minute.

In 1984, Naik founded Virtual Computer Pvt. Ltd., and was among the first to import a wave-soldering machine to manufacture printed circuit boards of PCs.

From 1990–91, Naik entered into networking products as a distributor of D-Link brand products. Within 3 years, he decided to start manufacturing of networking products in India as a joint venture with D-Link. Taking financial and tax advantages offered by the government of Goa, he shifted manufacturing operations from the Ansa Industrial Estate in Mumbai to Verna Electronic City, Goa. In 1994–95 he also started a passive networking-products company together with UK-based passive components company Sapphire UK Ltd. In 1994, he entered into a joint venture with D-Link Corporation Taiwan and helped constructing new buildings and importing SMT lines from Japan.

In 1995, Naik set out to create a completely new channel for D-Link products. Rather than going after large distributors he decided to put a regional distribution model in place—arguably the first in India among the IT channel.

Honours and awards

Personal life

Naik's wife Sudha Naik is a homemaker; they have 2 daughters: Arati Naik and Dr. Lakshana Sharma (who is married to Dr. Amit Sharma).

References

External links
 Smartlink Network Systems Ltd
 MAIT

1947 births
Living people
People from Karwar
Indian computer scientists
Indian company founders
Businesspeople from Karnataka